Edmond Verbustel is a Belgian figure skater who competed in pair skating.

With partner Suzanne Diskeuve, in 1947 he won bronze medals at both the European Figure Skating Championships (in Davos) and the World Figure Skating Championships (in Stockholm).

Competitive highlights 
With  Suzanne Diskeuve

References 

Belgian pair skaters
Date of birth missing
Date of death missing
Possibly living people